Treasure cave may refer to
 A cave with treasure
 Cave of Treasures, New Testament apocrypha
 An attraction at Kings Dominion
 Treasure Cave brand blue cheese by Caves of Faribault, Faribault, Minnesota, United States
Treasure Cave, an archaeological site by Nahal Mishmar, Israel